Jonathan Erlich and Andy Ram were the defending champions, but Erlich chose not to participate due to injury, and only Ram competed that year.Ram partnered with Max Mirnyi, they lost in the final to Mardy Fish and Andy Roddick 6–3, 1–6, [12–14]

Seeds

Draw

Finals

Top half

Bottom half

External links
Draw

2009 ATP World Tour
2009 BNP Paribas Open